The 2016 NCAA Division I softball tournament was held from May 20 through June 8, 2016 as the final part of the 2016 NCAA Division I softball season. The 64 NCAA Division I college softball teams were to be selected out of an eligible 293 teams on May 15, 2016. Thirty-two teams were awarded an automatic bid as champions of their conference, and thirty-two teams were selected at-large by the NCAA Division I softball selection committee. The tournament culminated with eight teams playing in the 2016 Women's College World Series at ASA Hall of Fame Stadium in Oklahoma City in which the Oklahoma Sooners were crowned the champions.

Automatic bids
The Big 12, Big West, Mountain West, Pac-12, and West Coast Conference bids were awarded to the regular season champion. All other conferences have the automatic bid go to the conference tournament winner.

National seeds
16 National Seeds were announced on the Selection Show Sunday, May 15 at 10 p.m. EDT on ESPNU. The 16 national seeds hosted the Regionals. Teams in italics advanced to Super Regionals. Teams in bold advanced to Women's College World Series.

1.  (53–5)
2.  (46–5)
3. Oklahoma (47–7)
4. Auburn (49–9)
5.  (44–8)
6. Alabama (46–12)
7.  (46–4)
8.  (48–8)

9.  (43–12)
10.  (45–15)
11.  (36–13)
12.  (35–13–1)
13.  (41–14)
14. Louisiana–Lafayette (43–7)
15.  (39–14)
16.  (40–17)

Regionals and Super Regionals
The Regionals took place May 19–22. The Columbia regional took place May 19–21 because of BYU's no Sunday-play policy. All other regionals occurred May 20–22. The Super Regionals took place from May 26–29.

Gainesville Super Regional

Tallahassee Super Regional

Eugene Super Regional

Auburn Super Regional

Norman Super Regional

Tuscaloosa Super Regional

Harrisonburg Super Regional

Ann Arbor Super Regional

Women's College World Series
The Women's College World Series was held June 2 through June 8, 2016, in Oklahoma City.

Participants

Bracket

Championship game

Record by conference

The columns RF, SR, WS, NS, CS, and NC respectively stand for the Regional Finals, Super Regionals, College World Series Teams, National Semi-Finals, Championship Series, and National Champion.

Media coverage

Radio
Westwood One provided nationwide radio coverage of the championship series. It was streamed online at westwoodsports.com and through TuneIn. Kevin Kugler and Leah Amico provided the call for Westwood One.

Television
ESPN holds exclusive rights to the tournament. They aired games across ESPN, ESPN2, and ESPNU. Select regionals and  super-regionals were broadcast on additional ESPN stations like SEC Network, ESPN3, SEC Network Plus, and Longhorn Network. Any regionals not picked up by ESPN were streamed online by the host institution or broadcast by their television partners.

Broadcast assignments

Regionals
Columbia: Pam Ward & Cheri Kempf
Gainesville: Trey Bender & Jennie Ritter
Tallahassee: Melissa Lee & Leah Ross
Tuscaloosa: Cara Capuano & Leah Amico
Knoxville: Beth Mowins & Michele Smith
Auburn: Tiffany Greene & Jenny Dalton-Hill 
Lafayette: Adam Amin & Amanda Scarborough (ESPN Nets)Tyler Denning & Megan Willis (LHN)
Norman: Jenn Hildreth & Carol Bruggeman
Eugene: Mark Neely & Danielle Lawrie
Athens: Kaleb Frady & Natalie Kerns
Baton Rouge: Lyn Rollins & Yvette Girouard
Lexington: Dave Baker & Dorian Craft (Fri) or Ginny Carroll (Sat/Sun)
Ann Arbor: Lisa Byington & Stacey Phillips (BTN) 
Harrisonburg: Curt Dudley & Kim Fucci (Madizone HD SN) 
Seattle: Mike Brown (P12 WASH)
Los Angeles- No commentary (P12 UCLA)

Super Regionals
Gainesville: Trey Bender & Jennie Ritter
Norman: Adam Amin & Amanda Scarborough
Harrisonburg: Jenn Hildreth & Carol Bruggeman
Tallahassee: Cara Capuano & Leah Amico
Tuscaloosa: Beth Mowins, Michele Smith, & Jessica Mendoza
Ann Arbor: Pam Ward & Cheri Kempf
Auburn: Tiffany Greene & Jenny Dalton-Hill
Eugene: Mark Neely & Danielle Lawrie
Women's College World Series
Adam Amin, Amanda Scarborough, & Laura Rutledge (afternoons)
Beth Mowins, Jessica Mendoza, Michele Smith, & Holly Rowe (evenings & championship series)

References

NCAA Division I softball tournament
Tournament